John Lowell McLaren (born September 29, 1951) is an American former professional baseball coach and manager. He is best known for his brief tenure as manager of the Seattle Mariners, from July 1,  to June 19, . A native of the Houston, Texas area, McLaren was a catcher in the Houston Astros minor league system from 1970 to 1976, and later managed in the Toronto Blue Jays minor league system. 

He became a major league coach with the Blue Jays in 1986 and has since held major league coaching positions with the Mariners, Boston Red Sox, Cincinnati Reds, Tampa Bay Devil Rays, and Washington Nationals. He also served as a coach for the United States national baseball team during the 2006 World Baseball Classic, spent two nonconsecutive seasons as a scout in the Devil Rays/Rays organization, and was interim manager of the Nationals for three games in 2011. He was employed as a professional scout for the Oakland Athletics organization from 2012 to 2015. He was the catching coach for the Philadelphia Phillies under manager Pete Mackanin for the 2016 season.

Early life
McLaren graduated from Westbury High School in Houston in 1970, and attended Blinn College, the University of St. Thomas and Houston Baptist University.

Playing career
McLaren, a catcher, was selected by the Houston Astros in the seventh round of the 1970 June MLB draft and was assigned to the rookie-level Covington Astros of the Appalachian League. He hit a home run in his first professional game on June 30. 

He led Western Carolinas League catchers in putouts and assists in 1971, and in 1973 at Columbus led Southern League catchers in fielding. His best offensive season came in 1975, when he batted .270 with 13 home runs and 57 runs batted in for the Iowa Oaks and Dubuque Packers. His playing career lasted through the 1976 season, having peaked at the triple-A level.

Coaching and managing career
In the 1979 season McLaren became manager of the Utica Blue Jays, a Toronto Blue Jays short-season single-A affiliate. He managed two other Blue Jays affiliates: the single-A Kinston Blue Jays from 1981–1982, and the double-A Knoxville Blue Jays from 1983–1985.

He held various positions on Piniella's coaching staffs with the Seattle Mariners and Tampa Bay Devil Rays from 1993 through 2005.

McLaren served as the third-base coach for the United States during the 2006 World Baseball Classic, but worked as a scout for the Devil Rays during the 2006 season. After the season, McLaren was named bench coach of the Mariners for the third time, this time under manager Mike Hargrove. Hargrove abruptly resigned on July 1, 2007, and McLaren was named as his replacement. The Mariners finished the  season in second place in the American League West standings, the first time they finished above last place since .

McLaren was fired as manager on June 19, 2008, largely because the Mariners had a payroll in excess of $100 million, yet possessed the worst record in baseball (25–47) at the time. His firing followed the firing of general manager Bill Bavasi by three days. Jim Riggleman, the bench coach, replaced McLaren on an interim basis.

McLaren spent the  season as a scout in the Rays organization and in November 2009 was hired as the Washington Nationals' bench coach under manager Riggleman. He became interim manager of the Nationals on June 24, 2011, a day following Riggleman's resignation, and was ejected in his first game as interim manager against the Chicago White Sox; he was replaced with Davey Johnson for the remainder of the 2011 season after McLaren managed three games. McLaren subsequently resigned his coaching position and took a position as a scout for the Nationals organization.

Honors
In 1991, McLaren was inducted into the Kinston Professional Baseball Hall of Fame.

Managerial record

References

External links

McLaren bio on SeattleMariners.com
 McLaren's profanity laced news conference (clean)
January 2007 article

1951 births
Living people
American Association of Professional Baseball managers
American expatriate baseball people in Canada
Baseball catchers
Baseball coaches from Texas
Baseball in China
Baseball players from Texas
Boston Red Sox coaches
Cincinnati Reds coaches
Cocoa Astros players
Columbus Astros players
Covington Astros players
Dubuque Packers players
Iowa Oaks players
Major League Baseball bench coaches
Major League Baseball bullpen coaches
Major League Baseball hitting coaches
Major League Baseball third base coaches
Memphis Blues players
Minor league baseball managers
National baseball team managers
Oakland Athletics scouts
Philadelphia Phillies coaches
Seattle Mariners coaches
Seattle Mariners managers
Sumter Astros players
Tampa Bay Devil Rays coaches
Tampa Bay Rays scouts
Toronto Blue Jays coaches
Toronto Blue Jays scouts
United States national baseball team people
Washington Nationals coaches
Washington Nationals managers
World Baseball Classic managers